Barnett Township is one of thirteen townships in DeWitt County, Illinois, USA.  As of the 2010 census, its population was 406 and it contained 198 housing units.

Geography

Unincorporated towns
 Hallsville at 
 Jenkins at 
 Midland City at 
 Tabor at 
(This list is based on USGS data and may include former settlements.)

Cemeteries
The township contains these two cemeteries: Barnett and McClimans.

Major highways
  Illinois Route 10

Airports and landing strips
 Hooterville Airport

School districts
 Clinton Community Unit School District 15
 Olympia Community Unit School District 16

Political districts
 State House District 87
 State Senate District 44

References
 
 United States Census Bureau 2009 TIGER/Line Shapefiles
 United States National Atlas

External links
 City-Data.com
 Illinois State Archives
 Township Officials of Illinois

Townships in DeWitt County, Illinois
Populated places established in 1858
1858 establishments in Illinois
Townships in Illinois